USS Menges (DE-320) was an  built for the United States Navy during World War II.

Namesake
Herbert Hugo Menges was born on 20 January 1917 in Louisville, Kentucky. He enlisted in the Naval Reserve as seaman second class at Robertson, Missouri on 3 July 1939. He was killed during the Attack on Pearl Harbor on 7 December 1941.

History

World War II
Menges was laid down by Consolidated Steel Corporation of Orange, Texas on 22 March 1943; launched 15 June 1943, sponsored by Mrs. Charles Menges, mother of the late Ensign Menges; and commissioned 26 October 1943. After shakedown off Bermuda, Menges spent January 1944 on "schoolship" duty in the lower Chesapeake Bay. On 26 January she got underway from Norfolk, Virginia for New York City, and on 31 January departed for Europe, on the first three-month-long deployment escorting convoys. On the night of 20 April her convoy, UGS 38, while off the coast of Algiers en route to the east coast of the U.S., was attacked by 30 German torpedo bombers.

Torpedo attack
The explosion was so violent that the aft third of the ship was destroyed, killing 31 men and wounding 25. However, Commander McCabe refused to give the order to abandon ship as long as there was chance of saving her. In addition, several of the crew members heroically jumped astride torpedoes loosened in the blast to disarm them. Menges, thanks to such creditable action, remained afloat.

Four hours later Menges was taken in tow by HMS Aspirant, and later on 3 May reached Bougie, Algeria to disembark her dead and wounded. The "new" ship came out of drydock at the Brooklyn Navy Yard for shakedown from 26 September to 20 October in Casco Bay, Maine.

Convoy duty
On 15 November Menges steamed in convoy CU 47 from New York for Europe, arriving Plymouth, England on 26 November. On 18 March Menges assisted Lowe in sinking , their first target. She continued antisubmarine sweep and patrol operations until the German surrender on 7 May.

Coast guard service
On 30 May she escorted her last convoy to Europe, CU 73, arriving Cheshire, England on 8 June. Menges arrived back in New York on 21 June for duty as a training ship for the United States Coast Guard Academy, with two cadet cruises to the West Indies before arriving New London, Connecticut on 7 September. Three days later she departed for the Cape Cod area, arriving Boston, Massachusetts on 17 September. By Navy Day, 27 October, Menges was moored at Fall River, below Boston.

Menges received two battle stars for her World War II service.

Retirement
The escort ship moved on to Green Cove Springs, Florida for assignment in March 1946 to the 16th (Inactive Reserve) Fleet. Menges decommissioned in January 1947 and entered the berthing area in the St. Johns River to spend the next 15 years there in reserve. By 1 January 1962 she was berthed at Orange, Texas in the Atlantic Reserve Fleet, where she remained until stricken from the Naval Vessel Register 2 January 1971, the ship was sold for scrapping on 10 April 1972.

References

External links
 U.S. Coast Guard Cutter List: USS Menges
 U-Boat Archive U-371

Edsall-class destroyer escorts
World War II frigates and destroyer escorts of the United States
Ships built in Orange, Texas
1943 ships